Soledad Bengoecha de Cármena (21 March 18491893) was a Spanish composer. She was born in Madrid, and studied music with Arriola, Jesús de Monasterio and Nicolás Rodríguez Ledesma. She died in Madrid.

Works
Selected works include:
Flor de los cielos, zarzuela (1894) 
El gran día, zarzuela (1894) 
A la fuerza ahorcan, zarzuela (1876) 
Sybille, overture (1873)
Mass (1867)
Marcha triunfal

References

1849 births
1893 deaths
19th-century classical composers
Women classical composers
Spanish women classical composers
Spanish music educators
Women music educators
19th-century women composers